Agitation Free was a German experimental krautrock band formed in 1967 by Michael "Fame" Günther (bass guitar), Lutz "Lüül" Ulbrich (guitar), Lutz Ludwig Kramer (guitar) and Christopher Franke (drums).

Name 
They were initially called Agitation, a name they chose at random from a dictionary. The band had to change the name because another band with the same name already existed. Agitation Free was chosen based on a poster for a free show played in the early 1970s saying "Agitation Free" (meaning "free concert").

History 
After losing guitarist Ax Genrich to Guru Guru in 1970 (Genrich having replaced Kramer the same year) and drummer Franke to Tangerine Dream in 1971, the band recruited Jörg "Joshi" Schwenke (guitar), Burghard Rausch (drums) and Michael Hoenig (keyboards). They released their first album, Malesch, in 1972 on the Music Factory label. The album was inspired by their tour through Egypt, Greece and Cyprus, sponsored by the German Goethe Institute. Later that year, they performed at the 1972 Munich Olympics.

A second album was released in 1973, and guitarist Schwenke was replaced first by Stefan Diez, then Gustl Lütjens. The band disbanded in 1974.

Agitation Free reunited in 1998, with the 1974 line-up, and released River of Return in 1999. The band again reformed in 2007 for a series of concerts in Tokyo. In 2008, remastered CDs of their back catalogue were officially released, and in 2011 they released Shibuya Nights, recorded at their 2007 Tokyo concerts.  In 2012, the band toured again to promote this album.

The band is included on the Nurse with Wound list.

Musical style and sound 
Agitation Free's music is psychedelic, experimental krautrock with elements of spaced-out ambient, experimental electronic and drone. The music for the most part consists of driving organ-patterned drone-like rock; seamless psychedelic cosmic musical textures with intricate musicianship and musical variety; hard, driving rock similar to Amon Düül II; and jamming that occasionally invokes the interplay and styles of Garcia, Weir and Lesh of The Grateful Dead and hints at a blues rock base not unlike The Allman Brothers Band. Many of their songs have a trance-inducing, psychedelic feel with sections of driving rock fueled by fiery and melodic moving guitar lines and solid, propelling and intricate drumming and a prominent bass line. All of Agitation Free's songs are instrumental apart from some recitation on "Haunted Island".

Their first album Malesch is cosmic, aggressive, psychedelic, creative, ethnically flavored (mainly by short interludes of recordings from Egypt), mysterious and densely packed with ideas whereas their second, titled 2nd is more laid-back and upbeat, with longer structure, much more of an emphasis on traditional styled jamming à la the Grateful Dead and a warmer and more straightforward sound. On Malesch the songs blend together to make a seamlessly flowing, tangential and uninterrupted musical journey, whereas on 2nd songs are more predictably structured, more varied in their sound and stand more as independent works.

Their sound is similar to, but  fairly distinguishable from, other contemporary Krautrock bands such as Ash Ra Tempel, Amon Düül II, Guru Guru, Brainticket, Yatha Sidhra and Kalacakra, as well as the mixed-influence blues-based jam rock of The Grateful Dead and The Allman Brothers noticeable on 2nd, and slightly later and more symphonic bands like Asia Minor and Anyone's Daughter.

Personnel

Members 
 Lutz Ulbrich – guitars (1967–1974, 1998–1999, 2007, 2012–2013)
 Michael Günther – bass guitar (1967–1974, 1998–1999, 2007, 2012)
 Christopher Franke – drums (1967–1971)
 Lutz Ludwig Kramer – guitars (1967–1970)
 Michael Duwe – vocals (1967)
 Ax Genrich – guitars (1970)
 Jörg Schwenke – guitars (1970–1973)
 Michael Hoenig – keyboards, electronics (1971–1974, 2007, 2012–2013)
 Burghard Rausch – drums (1971–1974, 1998–1999, 2007, 2012–2013)
 Dietrman Burmeister – drums, percussion (1973)
 Stefan Diez – guitars (1973)
 Gustl Lütjens – guitars (1973–1974, 1998–1999, 2007, 2012–2013)
 Bernhard Arndt – keyboards (1974)
 Daniel Cordes – bass guitar (2013)

Lineups 
N.B. changes in bold

Discography 
 Malesch (1972)
 2nd (1973)
 Last (released 1976, recorded live 1974)
 Fragments (released 1995 and again in 1996, recorded live 1974)
 At the Cliffs of River Rhine (released 1998, recorded live 1974) Garden of Delights
 The Other Sides of Agitation Free (released 1999, recorded in Berlin, 1974)
 River of Return (1999)
 Shibuya Nights (live February 2007 in Tokyo, released 2011 on Esoteric Recordings)

References

Further reading 
 Ulbrich, Lutz: „Lüül". Ein Musikerleben zwischen Agitation Free, Ashra, Nico, der Neuen Deutschen Welle und den 17 Hippies" – Schwarzkopf & Schwarzkopf – Berlin 2006, 
 Ehnert, Günter: Rock in Deutschland: Lexikon dt. Rockgruppen u. Interpreten / Günter Ehnert ; Detlef Kinsler. - Orig.-Ausg., (3., aktualisierte u. erw. Aufl.). - Hamburg : Taurus Press, 1984. - 434 S. ; 18 cm, 
 Christian Graf: "Rocklexikon Deutschland". Verlag Schwarzkopf & Schwarzkopf, 2002, 
 Frank Laufenberg, Ingrid Laufenberg: Frank Laufenbergs Hit-Lexikon des Rock und Pop., Ullstein Tb., Oktober 2002. 
 Christian Graf, Burghard Rausch: Rockmusiklexikon Europa, Bd. 1., Fischer Tb., Frankfurt Juli 2005. 
 Christian Graf, Burghard Rausch: Rockmusiklexikon Europa, Bd. 2., Fischer Tb., Frankfurt Juli 2005. 
 Christian Graf, Burghard Rausch: Rockmusiklexikon Amerika, Afrika, Asien, Australien, Fischer Tb, Frankfurt Oktober 2003. 
 Tibor Kneif: Sachlexikon Rockmusik. Instrumente, Stile, Techniken, Industrie und Geschichte, Reinbek b. Hamburg: Rowohlt, überarbeitete und erweiterte Ausgabe 1980.  (Lexikon und Beispielsammlung aus Rock 'n' Roll, Rhythm & Blues, Jazz rock, Funk metal, Country rock, Folk rock, Blues rock, Hard rock, Punk, New Wave sowie ein Register)
 Tibor Kneif: Rockmusik. Ein Handbuch zum kritischen Verständnis. Mit einem Beitrag von Carl-Ludwig Reichert, Reinbek bei Hamburg: Rowohlt, 1982.  (mit einem Kapitel über die Grundlagen der Rockmusik, z. B. Elemente, Instrumente und stilistische Wurzeln sowie Materialien zu einer Theorie der Rockmusik, ihrer Soziologie, Ästhetik und Geschichte)
 Artemy Troitsky: "Rock in Russland: Rock und Subkultur in der UdSSR", Hannibal-Verlag, Wien 1989. 
 Zöller, Christa. Rockmusik als jugendliche Weltanschauung und Mythologie. Religion und Biographie, Bd. 2. Münster: Lit. 2000. 
 Steven & Alan Freeman: The crack in the cosmic egg: encyclopedia of Krautrock, Kosmische musik & other progressive, experimental & electronic musics from Germany, 1996, Audition Publ., Leicester

External links 
 Agitation Free official website – includes extensive history of the band (English language)
 Lüül – official site (German language)
 Christopher Franke – official site (English language)
 Official site

German progressive rock groups
Musical groups established in 1967
Musical groups disestablished in 2013
Krautrock musical groups
1967 establishments in West Germany
2013 disestablishments in Germany
German psychedelic rock music groups